Anne Kristine Linnestad  (born 19 December 1961) is a Norwegian politician.

She was elected deputy representative to the Storting for the period 2017–2021 for the Conservative Party. She replaced Henrik Asheim at the Storting from October to November 2017, and again from 2020 when Asheim took a cabinet seat.

Linnestad was a member of Ski municipal council from 1999 to 2019, serving as mayor from 2011 to 2015. In 2020 Ski municipality was merged into Nordre Follo, and Linnestad continued in the municipal council there.

References

1961 births
Living people
People from Ski, Norway
Conservative Party (Norway) politicians
Members of the Storting
Mayors of places in Akershus
Norwegian women in politics
Women members of the Storting